Hastings Central is the central suburb and business district of Hastings City, in the Hawke's Bay Region of New Zealand's North Island.

Demographics

Hastings Central had a population of 444 at the 2018 New Zealand census, an increase of 78 people (21.3%) since the 2013 census, and a decrease of 15 people (−3.3%) since the 2006 census. There were 165 households, comprising 246 males and 198 females, giving a sex ratio of 1.24 males per female. The median age was 34.2 years (compared with 37.4 years nationally), with 51 people (11.5%) aged under 15 years, 135 (30.4%) aged 15 to 29, 207 (46.6%) aged 30 to 64, and 48 (10.8%) aged 65 or older.

Ethnicities were 60.8% European/Pākehā, 19.6% Māori, 4.1% Pacific peoples, 22.3% Asian, and 2.7% other ethnicities. People may identify with more than one ethnicity.

The percentage of people born overseas was 33.8, compared with 27.1% nationally.

Although some people chose not to answer the census's question about religious affiliation, 47.3% had no religion, 33.8% were Christian, 2.0% had Māori religious beliefs, 2.0% were Hindu, 1.4% were Muslim, 0.7% were Buddhist and 8.1% had other religions.

Of those at least 15 years old, 63 (16.0%) people had a bachelor's or higher degree, and 66 (16.8%) people had no formal qualifications. The median income was $24,300, compared with $31,800 nationally. 18 people (4.6%) earned over $70,000 compared to 17.2% nationally. The employment status of those at least 15 was that 210 (53.4%) people were employed full-time, 66 (16.8%) were part-time, and 18 (4.6%) were unemployed.

Economy and amenities

The Bay Plaza includes a Kmart store. It was renovated in 2013.

Hastings City Art Gallery opened in 2009.

Education

Hastings Central has two public schools:

There are also three private schools in the area:

References

Suburbs of Hastings, New Zealand
Central business districts in New Zealand